Il sentiero dell'odio (translation: The Pathway of Hate) is a 1950 Italian melodrama film directed by Sergio Grieco in his directoral debut.

Cast
 Marina Berti 
 Andrea Checchi  
 Carla Del Poggio
 Vittorio Duse 
 Checco Rissone
 Alessandro Fersen 
 Piero Lulli
 Renato Malavasi
 Ermanno Randi

External links
 

1950 films
1950s Italian-language films
Films directed by Sergio Grieco
1950 directorial debut films
1950 drama films
Italian drama films
Italian black-and-white films
1950s Italian films